Álvaro Roberto de Ávila Pires (born 13 August 1941 in Rio de Janeiro) was a Brazilian sportsman. He competed in two Olympics. He represented Brazil in swimming at the 1964 Olympics and in water polo at the 1968 Olympics.

At the 1963 Pan American Games, in São Paulo, he finished 4th in the 4×100-metre medley, and 5th in the 100-metre freestyle.

At the 1964 Summer Olympics in Tokyo, he swam the 100-metre freestyle and the 4×100-metre medley, not reaching the finals.

At the 1968 Summer Olympics in Mexico City, he finished 13th with the Brazilian Water Polo team.

References

External links 
 
 

1941 births
Living people
Brazilian male water polo players
Swimmers at the 1963 Pan American Games
Swimmers at the 1964 Summer Olympics
Water polo players at the 1968 Summer Olympics
Olympic swimmers of Brazil
Olympic water polo players of Brazil
Brazilian male freestyle swimmers
Pan American Games competitors for Brazil
Swimmers from Rio de Janeiro (city)
21st-century Brazilian people
20th-century Brazilian people